Bai Yan and Riccardo Ghedin were the defending champions, but chose not to defend their title.
Johan Brunström and Andreas Siljeström won the title after defeating Gero Kretschmer and Alexander Satschko 6–3, 6–4 in the final.

Seeds

Draw

References
 Main Draw

Doubles
KPN Bangkok Open - Doubles
 in Thai tennis